Piravom is a municipality in Ernakulam district and a suburb of Kochi in the Indian state of Kerala. It is located with in 31 km southeast of Kochi city center, at the boundary of the Ernakulam and Kottayam districts. Piravom is famous for its Hindu temples and Christian churches. Piravom has a river-front, verdant hills, and paddy fields.

History 
Piravom was owned by the Vadakkumkoor Kingdom until it was captured by Travancore kingdom, and is now part of the Indian state of Kerala.

Piravom was reverted to panchayat status in 1992 after two years as a municipality because of skepticism that its classification as a municipality would attract higher tax rates and building regulation. However, as modern municipal councils now have the authority to fix the tax rate and new building rule provisions are now applicable to special grade panchayats, the economic incentive for Piravom remaining a panchayat has disappeared. The local government of Piravom passed a unanimous resolution for elevation to municipality status. In 2015, the government of Kerala reclassified Piravom as a municipality.

The Kerala state government and the GCDA have plans to incorporate Angamaly, Perumbavoor, Piravom and Kolenchery in Ernakulam district, Mala and Kodungallur in Thrissur district, Thalayolaparambu and Vaikom in Kottayam, and Cherthala in Alappuzha district into the jurisdiction of the Kochi metropolis. The newly formed metropolis would be put under the charge of a new authority called the Kochi Metropolitan Regional Development Authority.

Places of Interest

 Pazhoor Padippura is an astrology center linked to Pazhoor Perumthrikkovil located in Piravom is referred in the Aithihyamala by Kottarathil Sankunni.

 Pazhoor Perumthrikkovil is a temple of Shiva of Hindu tradition located at the town of Piravom. The temple is believed to be nearly 1,800 years old. Pazhoor Perumthrikkovil is also mentioned in Aithihyamala.

 Piravom Valiya Pally is one of the oldest churches in Kerala. It stands on a hilltop on the eastern bank of the Muvattupuzha River.

The silver, shimmering water cascading down from around 100 feet with forest and rubber plantations in the background is a sight to behold.

Educational Institutions
 Government Higher Secondary School, Piravom
 Government Higher Secondary School, Namakuzhy
 M.K.M.H.S.S., Piravom
 Fatima Matha Central School
 St. Joseph's Higher Secondary School
 Holy Kings Public school Piravom
 BPC College Piravom
 MSM ITI, Piravom
 Vivekananda Public School
 Toc H Public School
 Chinmaya Vishwavidyapeeth, a deemed university under the de novo category, Peppathy
 Naipunnya St. Michael's Public School, Veliyanad.

13. Government LPS Piravom

14. Government LPS Pazhoor

15. Government LPS Kalampoor

16. Government LPS Namakkuzhy

17. CMS LPS Edappallichira

18. St. Antony's LPS Kalluvettamata

19. Government UPS Kakkad

20. Government UPS Kalampoor

Places of Worship

  30 Spiritual Feast, Kakkad, Piravom.
31. Puthussery Thrikka Balanarasimha Swamy Temple

32. Acharyakovil Devi temple

33. Pallippattu Devi Temple, Pazhoor

34. Peringamala Shreekrishna swami temple

35. Thirumanamkunnu Devi temple

36. Oozhathumala Mahadeva temple

37. Melpazhur Mana Temple

38. Kalampoorkkavu Devi Temple

Festivals
 Holy Danaha Perunnal at St. Mary's Orthodox Syrian Cathedral (Piravom valiya pally perunnal)
 Vishudha Rajakanmarude Thirunnal at Piravom Kochu pally
 Pazhoor Shivaraathri and Thiruvaathira Aarattu Maholthsavam
Easter at St. Mary's Orthodox Syrian Cathedral (Piravom valiya pally)
 Thiruvathira Mahotsavam of Thiruveeshamkulam Temple
 Pallikkavu Meenabharani Festival
Acharikovil Meenabharani Festival
 Athachamayam Festival
 Kalamboor Kaavu pana Maholsavam [Kalampoor], Thookkam
 Medam Rohini Mahotsavam, Sree Purushamangalam Temple, Kakkad
 Pazhoor Pallippattu Temple Pana Maholsavam
 Makara Vilakku Maholsavam at Parekkunnu Sree Dharma Sastha Temple Piravom
 Makara Vilaku Ulsavam at Thaliyil Ayyapa Temple [Kalampoor]

Politics 
Piravom Assembly Constituency has been incorporated into Kottayam Lok Sabha Constituency, led by Thomas Chazhikadan, as a part of the delimitation of parliament seats in India. The assembly was previously part of Muvattupuzha Lok Sabha Constituency.Anoop Jacob is the MLA of Piravom assembly constituency.LDF is the ruling front in Piravom municipality. Eliyamma Philip is the Municipal Chairperson of Piravom Municipality, and K.P Salim former panchayat president of Piravom and M.G. University Senator is the Vice Chairman. Piravom assembly constituency came into being in 1977. Before that Piravom Municipality was part of Muvattupuzha assembly constituency. T M Jacob was the first MLA of Piravom. P C Chacko, Benny Behanan, Gopi Kottamurickal, M J Jacob were the other MLAs. Piravom was part of Muvattupuzha parliamentary constituency until 2019. From then, it is part of Kottayam parliamentary constituency. Prof. C Poulose, former Piravom Panchayath President was a prominent figure in Piravom politics. Umadevi Antharjanam,  K P Salim and Sabu K Jacob were also Piravom Panchayath Presidents.

Transportation 
The nearest railway station to Piravom is the Piravam Road Railway Station (Velloor), which has stops for all passenger trains and most express trains. The nearest major railway station is at Ernakulam.

The nearest airport, Cochin International Airport, is at Nedumbassery.

A government transport (KSRTC) bus depot is located at Piravom.

A private bus stand is located at the center of Piravom. The buses provide connectivity to Kochi and nearby towns.

Location
The town is situated on the banks of the Muvattupuzha River.

Nearby towns and cities

 Kochi (31 km)
 Kottayam (40 km)
 Muvattupuzha (20 km)
 Ettumanoor (31 km)
 Koothattukulam (15 km)
 Thrippunithura (21 km)
 Vaikom (25 km)
 Thodupuzha (35 km)
 Palai (33 km)
 Aluva (37 km)
 Perumbavoor (34 km)
 Kolenchery (16 km)
 Kothamangalam (33 km)
 Thalayolaparambu(15 km)
 Kaduthuruthy(14 km)

See also
 Piravom Valiya Palli
 Pazhoor Padippura
 Kalamboor Kavu Devi Temple
 Malankara Orthodox Syrian Church
 Syriac Orthodox Church
 Thirumarayoor

References

External links 

thumb
 Piravom Website
 Scenes From Piravam
 Piravom – From Annals of Kerala Church
Chinmaya Vishwavidyapeeth

Chinmaya International Foundation
 Assembly Constituencies – Corresponding Districts and Parliamentary Constituencies
 
 Remaining Date for Piravom Municipality Election 2020

Cities and towns in Ernakulam district